Dame Janet Frances de Botton,  (née Wolfson; formerly Green; born 31 March 1952) is a British art collector and philanthropist.

Janet de Botton is the eldest daughter of Lord Wolfson and his wife, Ruth (née Sterling), who married in 1949, and a granddaughter of Sir Isaac Wolfson, founder of the Great Universal Stores family; she is the former wife of the broadcasting executive Michael Green. Her late husband, Swiss financier Gilbert de Botton, sold Global Asset Management for £234m in 1999.

In June 2010, the Wolfson Foundation announced the appointment of de Botton as the new Chairman following a unanimous decision by the Trustees. De Botton has been a Trustee of Tate and Chairman of the Council of Tate Modern.

In 2007, she appeared at number 22 (down from number 18, in 2006) in the Sunday Times Rich List, with an estimated personal fortune of £285 million. She is a prominent collector of modern art. In 1996, she presented 60 works of art to the Tate, including examples by Carl Andre, Richard Artschwager, Gilbert & George, Richard Long, Cindy Sherman, Roni Horn, Gary Hume, Nancy Spero, Andy Warhol and Bill Woodrow.

She was appointed Commander of the Most Excellent Order of the British Empire (CBE) in  2006 and elevated to Dame Commander of the Order of the British Empire (DBE) in the 2013 Birthday Honours for charitable services to the arts.

According to the Sunday Times Giving List in 2020, de Botton gave £65.1 million to charitable causes in 2019.

See also
 Wolfson family

References

External links
 
 

1952 births
Living people
Art collectors from London
Philanthropists from London
Women philanthropists
English contract bridge players
English people of Polish-Jewish descent
Dames Commander of the Order of the British Empire
Daughters of life peers
Fellows of King's College London